Grødem is a village in Randaberg municipality in Rogaland county, Norway. The village is a middle-class suburb of the city of Stavanger, located immediately to the south. The European route E39 highway runs along the west side of the village. The entrance to the Byfjord Tunnel lies at the north end of the village. Grødem Church is located in the village.

References

Villages in Rogaland
Randaberg